Gianni Faresin (born 16 July 1965) is an Italian former road bicycle racer, who competed professionally from 1988 to 2004. He currently works as a directeur sportif for UCI Continental team , for whom his son Edoardo rides. Faresin was born in Marostica.

Major results

1991
 1st GP Industria & Artigianato di Larciano
 1st Gran Premio Città di Camaiore
1992
 1st GP Industria & Artigianato di Larciano
1994
 1st Gran Premio Città Di Cordignano
 1st Stage 3 Giro del Trentino
1995
 1st Overall Hofbrau Cup
1st Stage 3
 1st Giro di Lombardia
1996
 1st Stage 3 Giro del Trentino
1997
 1st  Road race, National Road Championships
 1st GP Industria & Artigianato di Larciano
2000
 1st  Intermediate Sprints Classification 2000 Vuelta a España
 1st LUK-Cup Bühl
2001
 1st Trofeo Matteotti

References

External links

Profile by world-of-cycling.com

1965 births
Living people
People from Marostica
Italian male cyclists
Cyclists from the Province of Vicenza